Norman Knight may refer to:

G. Norman Knight (1891–1978), British barrister
Norman L. Knight (1895–1972), American chemist and author
Norman Knight (English cricketer) (1914–2009), English cricketer and colonial administrator
Norman Knight (South African cricketer) (1946-2010), South African cricketer